Hide and seek may refer to:

 Hide-and-seek, a children's game

Film
 Hide and Seek (1932 cartoon), a Fleischer Studios Talkartoon animated short
 Hide and Seek (1963 film), a Swedish comedy film
 Hide and Seek (1964 film), a British thriller film
 Hide and Seek (1972 film), a British children's drama
 Hide and Seek (1980 film), an Israeli drama film
 Hide and Seek, a 1984 Canadian television film based on the novel The Adolescence of P-1 by Thomas J. Ryan
 Hide and Seek, a 1996 film directed by Su Friedrich
 Hide and Seek (2000 film) or Cord, a Canadian thriller film
 Hide & Seek, a 2004 short film starring Mem Ferda
 Hide and Seek (2005 film), an American horror film
 Hide & Seek (2005 animated film), or Kakurenbo, a Japanese anime short film
 Hide and Seek (2007 film), a Philippine horror film
 Hide n' Seek, a 2012 Indian Malayalam-language film
 Hide and Seek (2013 film), a South Korean mystery film
 Hide and Seek (2014 film), a British-American romantic drama film
 Hide and Seek (2018 film), a Swiss romantic comedy-drama film
 Hide and Seek (2021 film), an American horror-thriller film

Literature
 Hide and Seek (Collins novel), an 1854 novel by Wilkie Collins
 Hide & Seek (Patterson novel), a 1997 novel by James Patterson
 Hide and Seek (Rankin novel), a 1991 novel by Ian Rankin
 "Hide-and-Seek" (short story), a 1949 short story by Arthur C. Clarke
 Hide and Seek, a 2005 novel by Clare Sambrook

Music

Albums
 Hide and Seek (The Birthday Massacre album), 2012
 Hide & Seek (Janet Devlin album) or the title song, 2013
 Hide 'n' Seek, by Miho Nakayama, or the title song, 1989
 Hide and Seek (Plastic Tree album) or the title song, 1997
 Hide & Seek (Purple Kiss EP), 2021
 Hide and Seek (Weki Meki EP), 2020

Songs
 "Hide and Seek" (Howard Jones song), 1984
 "Hide and Seek" (Imogen Heap song), 2005
 "Hide and Seek" (Mirrors song), 2010
 "Hide and Seek" (Namie Amuro song), 2007
 "Hide and Seek" (Tracie Spencer song), 1988
 "Hide & Seek" (TVXQ song), 2014
 "Hide and Seek" / "Sunset Refrain", by Lead, 2020
 "Hide-and-Seek", by Band-Maid, B-side of "Glory", 2019
 "Hide and Seek", by Big Joe Turner
 "Hide and Seek", by Dannii Minogue from Unleashed, 2007
 "Hide and Seek", by Hale from Twilight, 2006
 "Hide and Seek", by Joshua Redman from Freedom in the Groove, 1996
 "Hide and Seek", by Loona from [12:00], 2020
 "Hide and Seek", by Simi from Omo Charlie Champagne, Vol. 1, 2019
 "Hide & Seek", by Stormzy from This Is What I Mean, 2022
 "Hide and Seek", by T-ara from Again, 2013
 "Hide and Seek", by Theatre of Tragedy from Forever Is the World, 2009

Television
 Hide and Seek (TV series), a 2018 South Korean series
 Hide and Seek (Eureka), a 2006 8-episode Eureka webseries

Episodes
 "Hide and Seek" (Bedlam), 2011
 "Hide and Seek" (Casualty), 1986
 "Hide and Seek" (Happy Tree Friends), 2000
 "Hide and Seek" (Hawkeye), 2021
 "Hide and Seek" (Here and Now), 2018
 "Hide and Seek" (Jay Jay the Jet Plane), 1998
 "Hide and Seek" (Nash Bridges), 1999
 "Hide and Seek" (NCIS), 2009
 "Hide and Seek" (Oobi), c. 2000
 "Hide and Seek" (Phineas and Ferb), 2009
 "Hide and Seek" (The Practice), 1997
 "Hide and Seek" (seaQuest DSV), 1994
 "Hide and Seek" (Severance), 2022
 "Hide and Seek" (Skippy the Bush Kangaroo), 1968/1969
 "Hide and Seek" (Soldier Soldier), 1993
 "Hide and Seek" (Star Trek: Picard), 2022
 "Hide and Seek" (Stargate Atlantis), 2004
 "Hide and Seek" (Teen Titans), 2005
 "Hide and Seek" (Woke Up Dead), 2009

Other uses
 Hide-and-Seek (card game), a variant of the patience game Travellers
 Hide-and-Seek (painting), a 1942 painting by Pavel Tchelitchew

See also
 Hide & Seekers, a 1964 album by the Seekers
 Hiding and Seeking, a 2004 documentary film
 Hyde & Seek, a 2016 Australian television series
 Ready or Not (disambiguation)